The Major League Baseball (MLB) season schedule generally consists of 162 games for each of the 30 teams in the American League (AL) and National League (NL), played over approximately six months – a total of 2,430 games, plus the postseason. The regular season runs from late March/early April to late September/early October, followed by the postseason which can run to early November.  The season begins with the official Opening Day, and, as of 2018, runs 26½ weeks through the last Sunday of September or first Sunday of October. One or more International Opener games may be scheduled outside the United States or Canada before the official Opening Day. It is possible for a given team to play a maximum of 22 games in the postseason in a given year, provided the team is a wild card and advances to each of the Division Series, Championship Series, and World Series with each series going the distance (3 games in the Wild Card series, 5 games in the Division Series, 7 games each in the League Championship Series/World Series).

The regular season is constructed from series.  Due to travel concerns and the sheer number of games, pairs of teams are never scheduled to play single games against each other (except in the instance of making up a postponed game, or more rarely, a one-game playoff to determine a postseason berth); instead they play games on several consecutive days in the same ballpark.  Teams play one mid-week series and one weekend series per week. Depending on the length of the series, mid-week series games are usually scheduled between Monday and Thursday, while weekend games are scheduled between Thursday and Monday.  Beginning in 2023, teams play a balanced schedule as follows: they play their 14 games against their four divisional opponents (56 games), six games against the other ten teams in their own league (60 games), four games against one "geographic rival" from the other league and three games against the other 14 teams from the other league for 46 total interleague games.  Under this schedule, divisional games consist of two four-game and two three-game series (one each home and away), intraleague games consist of two three-game series, and the interleague games consist of two two-game series against the geographic rival, and a single three-game series against the other interleague opponents (home team alternates every year).   

Note that rainouts and other cancellations are often rescheduled ad hoc during the season, sometimes as doubleheaders.  However, if two teams are scheduled to meet for the final time in the last two weeks of the season, and the game is cancelled, it may not be rescheduled if there is no impact on the divisional or wild card races.  For example, in 2016, the September 29 game between the Cleveland Indians and Detroit Tigers was originally cancelled due to rain. Because the teams were unable to reschedule a make-up date before the end of the season on October 2, and it did not affect the divisional race, the game was not rescheduled.  In contrast, a 2008 AL Central division game between Detroit and the Chicago White Sox needed to be made up following the last day of the regular season because it played a part in the division race involving the White Sox and the Minnesota Twins.

19th century
This account gives the length of the major league "championship season" schedule by league and year. During this era, there were a number of different leagues that would be deemed Major League.

Prior to the first league schedule in 1877, member clubs scheduled their own matches by mutual arrangement, including championship games necessarily with member clubs, other games with members, and games with non-member clubs. Some may have practically dictated their arrangements with some others, but there was no central control or coordination.

The listed years are those in which the league revised its schedule. For example, the National League (NL) scheduled 84 games during 1879, 1880, 1881, and 1882 – that is, four seasons from 1879, ending before 1883, the next listing. 1876 is listed here for convenience although the NL did not schedule games (see 1871 to 1876, below).

National Association of Professional Base Ball Players (1871–1875)
The National Association of Professional Base Ball Players (1871–1875) did not schedule games, nor did it control the number of teams, a major reason for its demise after the 1875 season. Clubs paid a $10 entry fee, later $20, to enter the Association for one season, and thereby declare for that year's national championship. Without continuing membership or heavy investment, there was little to deter a team from breaking a commitment, and though it happened, it was mainly due to clubs going out of business.

This listing gives the greatest number of games played by any club for each season. Naturally, the leader by games played was always a strong club fielding one of the better gate attractions.

1871: 33 games (Mutual, New York)
1872: 58 games (Lord Baltimore)
1873: 60 games (Boston)
1874: 71 games (Boston)
1875: 86 games (Hartford)

The leading numbers of games played to a decision were 33, 54, 59, 71, and 70 decisions; by the listed teams except the Mutuals in 1872.

National League (first 25 years of 1876-present)

The National League organized for 1876 on a different basis than the NAPBBP, granting exclusive memberships to eight clubs that would continue from year to year – it was generally expected, if only because membership would be profitable. But in its first season in 1876, the new league followed its predecessor in merely agreeing that each club would play a certain number of matches to a decision (excluding ties) by a certain date.  Boston played 70 games with its quota of ten decisions against every rival. The others achieved 56 to 68 decisions with 64 to 66 for the four western teams as the teams from New York and Philadelphia (eastern) abandoned their schedule-concluding road trips.

American Association (1882–1891)

1882: 80 games = 5 opponents @ 16 games each 
1883: 98 games = 7 opponents @ 16 games each 
1884-1885: 112 games = 7 opponents @ 16 games each 
1886-1891: 140 games = 7 opponents @ 20 games each

The AA expanded its schedule to 140 games two years before the National League did so. After 1891 this incarnation of the AA dissolved with four teams bought out and four others joining the NL, nominally creating one big league, the "National League and American Association" of 12 clubs.

Union Association (1884)

1884: 112 games – 7 opponents @ 16 games each for 7 opponents

Players' League (1890)

1890: 140 games = 20 games each for 7 opponents

20th century 
This account gives the originally announce length of the major league "championship season" schedule by league and year.

This does not include later announced curtailments of play by war (1918) or by strikes and lockouts (1972, 1981, 1994). The schedules for 1995 were revised and shortened from 162 to 144 games, after late resolution of the strike that had begun in 1994 required a delay in the season to accommodate limited spring training.

National League

American League

Recent season schedules

1998 to 2012
Since 1998, there have been 30 major league teams with a single advance schedule for every season that comprises 2430 games.  Each team plays 162 games, 81 as the "home" team, 81 as the "visitor". (This is true even on the rare occasion when a game is played at a ballpark not home to either team.)  Occasionally, the advance schedule is subsequently altered due to a game postponement or a one-game tie-breaker to determine which team will play in the postseason.

Before 2013, the schedule included 252 "interleague games" that matched one team from the American League and one from the National League; the other 2178 games matched a pair from within one league. About half of the latter matched teams from within one division and about half matched teams from different divisions in one league. In the Central Division of the National League, which alone had six teams, every pair of division rivals played 15 or 16 games. Within the other, smaller divisions every pair of teams played 18 or 19 games. These interleague games were played from mid-to-late May to late June or early July.

Division games (1091). There are 61 pairs of teams from within one division.

25 pairings will play 19 games each (475 games)
21 pairings will play 18 games each (378 games)
13 pairings will play 16 games each (208 games) – most NL Central pairings
2 pairings will play 15 games each (30 games) – two NL Central pairings
Total: 1091 games.

Other intraleague games (1087). There are 150 pairs of teams from two different divisions within one league.

23 pairings will play 10 games each (230 games)
15 pairings will play 9 games each (135 games)
8 pairings will play 8 games each (64 games)
34 pairings will play 7 games each (238 games)
70 pairings will play 6 games each (420 games)
Total: 1087 games.

Interleague play

The schedule for interleague play comprised 84 three-game series in each season from 1998 to 2012, divided as six series (18 games) for each of fourteen AL teams and as many as six for each of sixteen NL teams.

Among the 224 interleague pairs of teams, 11 played six games every year, which were scheduled in two three-game series "home and home", or one at each home ballpark. Five of these 11 special arrangements matched two teams in the same city or in neighboring cities, where they wholly or partly share territorial rights. Six were regional matches at greater distance, four of which were in the same state.

 Baltimore vs. Washington
 Chicago Cubs (North Side) vs. Chicago White Sox (South Side)
 Cincinnati vs. Cleveland
 Miami vs. Tampa Bay (Tampa/St. Petersburg)
 Houston vs. Texas (Dallas/Fort Worth/Arlington)
 Kansas City vs. St. Louis
 Los Angeles Angels vs. Los Angeles Dodgers
 Milwaukee vs. Minnesota (Minneapolis/St. Paul)
 New York Mets (Queens) vs. New York Yankees (Bronx)
 Oakland vs. San Francisco
 San Diego vs. Seattle

These special local and regional series accounted for 66 interleague games annually from 1998 to 2012, and the other 186 games were determined by rotation.

9/11 rescheduling
The 2001 season was suspended for one week due to the September 11 terrorist attacks and resulting disruptions in travel, resulting in games scheduled for September 11–16 being rescheduled to the first week of October and the playoffs and World Series being rescheduled one week later than their originally planned dates. This resulted in the World Series continuing into early November for the first time.

2013–2017
Schedule changes for 2013, precipitated by realignment that created two equal-sized leagues of 15 teams each, gave every team 20 interleague games. Sixteen of which were determined by a match of divisions, one from each league; all teams in a given division play all teams in a given division from the other league. (Each plays a three-game series against four teams from the designated division and two two-game series against the remaining team.) With this change, interleague games were now scattered throughout the season.

The matched divisions rotate annually:
AL East vs. NL West (2013), vs. NL Central (2014)
AL Central vs. NL East (2013), vs. NL West (2014)
AL West vs. NL Central (2013), vs. NL East (2014)

Each team played its four other interleague games against a designated "natural rival", with two games in each club's city. Thus all 30 teams, rather than 22 of 30 as previously, were deemed to have a natural rival in the other league. In 2013 the natural rivalry games were all scheduled for May 27 to May 30 (Memorial Day weekend) but in 2014 their scheduled dates range from May to August.

Ten of the natural rivalries from 2012 and earlier continued, while the Houston–Texas "Lone Star" rivalry had been transformed into an intra-division one with 19 games played. Five of the special arrangements were new in 2013 , including one each for Houston and Texas.

 Baltimore vs. Washington
 Boston vs. Philadelphia 
 New York Mets (Queens) vs. New York Yankees (Bronx)
 Miami vs. Tampa Bay (Tampa/St. Petersburg)
 Toronto vs. Atlanta 
 Chicago Cubs (North Side) vs. Chicago White Sox (South Side)
 Cincinnati vs. Cleveland
 Detroit vs. Pittsburgh 
 Kansas City vs. St. Louis
 Milwaukee vs. Minnesota (Minneapolis/St. Paul)
 Houston vs. Colorado 
 Los Angeles Angels of Anaheim vs. Los Angeles Dodgers
 Oakland vs. San Francisco
 San Diego vs. Seattle
 Texas vs. Arizona 

For 2014, four of the five new rivalries have been revised (‡), all except Detroit and Pittsburgh.
 Baltimore and Washington
 Boston vs. Atlanta (until 1952, both teams were based in Fenway–Kenmore) 
 New York Mets (Queens) vs. New York Yankees (Bronx)
 Miami vs. Tampa Bay (Tampa/St. Petersburg)
 Toronto vs. Philadelphia 
 Chicago Cubs (North Side) vs. Chicago White Sox (South Side)
 Cincinnati vs. Cleveland
 Detroit vs. Pittsburgh
 Kansas City vs. St. Louis
 Milwaukee vs. Minnesota (Minneapolis/St. Paul)
 Houston vs. Arizona 
 Los Angeles Angels of Anaheim vs. Los Angeles Dodgers
 Oakland vs. San Francisco
 San Diego vs. Seattle
 Texas vs. Colorado 

Every team now plays 19 games against each of 4 opponents within its division (76 games), as well as 6 games each against 4 opponents and 7 games against each of the other 6 opponents from other divisions within its own league (66 games).

When corresponding divisions (i.e. NL East vs. AL East) play each other, a slight adjustment was made to the interleague games. Teams now play 6 games against their rival and 4 games (home and home) against two opponents plus one home and one away 3-game series (20 total) against the other two teams in the opposing division.  This was done in 2015, 2018, and 2021.

2018–2019 
Under the collective bargaining agreement reached in December 2016, several changes were made to the scheduling pattern for the 2018 season. The overall length of the season was extended to 187 days with the addition of four off-days for all teams. All teams were scheduled to play on Opening Day, which for 2018 was March 29. Sunday Night Baseball will no longer be played on the final Sunday before the All-Star Game, in order to ease travel time for those who are participating in the Home Run Derby. A single, nationally televised night game will be played the following Thursday, with all other teams returning to play on Friday.

2020 

Due to the 2020 COVID-19 pandemic the start of the season was delayed until July 23. Each team would only play 60 games this season and every game will be against the teams in their division and teams in the corresponding division of the other league.

2023 
Under the collective bargaining agreement reached in March 2022, every team will play every other team regardless of league under a new balanced schedule. Teams will play 13 games against each of 4 opponents within its division (52 games), as well as 6 games each against 6 of the other 10 opponents within its own league and 7 games each against 4 of the other 10 opponents within its own league (64 games). Interleague play will consist of a four-game home and home series against the geographic rival and a single three-game series against the other 14 interleague opponents (46 games), with location to rotate every other year.

Time of first pitch

Start of Major League Baseball games depends on days of the week, game number in series, holidays, and other factors. As of 2021, most games start at 6:30 pm, 7 pm or 7:30 pm in the local time zone, so there are more night games than day games even though baseball is traditionally played during the day. The reason why there are more night baseball games is to attract more fans to ballparks as well as viewers from home because most fans would be at work or school during the day. On Mondays (excluding Opening Day and holidays), Tuesdays, and Fridays, games are almost exclusively played at night except for Cubs home games. Getaway days, days on which teams play their last game of the series before departing for another series in another city the next day, are often day games, mainly Sundays, Wednesdays, and Thursdays. On Sundays, usually all but one are day games, with the final game reserved for ESPN's Sunday Night Baseball. As of 2022, most Sunday afternoon games start at 1 pm or 1:30 pm in the local time zone.

About half of Saturday games are day games (1, 2 or 4 pm ET).  In some markets, Saturday night games start an hour earlier than usual night start times, but other cities start Saturday night games at the same time as weeknight games. In conclusion, weekday games are only played at night except for getaway days while many weekend games are played during the day.

First pitch typically occurs between 5 and 10 minutes past the hour, in order to allow time for pre-game ceremonies.

Washington Nationals home games played on the Fourth of July and Boston Red Sox home games played on the local Patriots' Day holiday start at 11:00 am in order to coincide with the events of the two cities that are scheduled to take place on the two respective days. These games are usually the only games to start before noon local time during the season.

References

Further reading
The Sporting News Baseball Guide
The MacMillan Baseball Encyclopedia
Retrosheet. "The Directory of Major League Years". Retrieved 2006-09-05.

S